The Big Kahuna is a 1999 American business comedy-drama film directed by John Swanbeck, and produced by Kevin Spacey, who also starred in the lead role. The film is adapted from the 1992 play Hospitality Suite, written by Roger Rueff, who also wrote the screenplay. John Swanbeck makes few attempts to lessen this film's resemblance to a stage performance: the majority of the film takes place in a single hotel room, and nearly every single line of dialogue is spoken by one of the three actors. The famous 1997 essay Wear Sunscreen is featured at the end of the film.

Plot
Larry Mann (Kevin Spacey) and Phil Cooper (Danny DeVito), who are both experienced marketing representatives working for an industrial lubricants company, attend a trade convention in Wichita, Kansas, in the American Midwest. They are joined in their hospitality suite by Bob Walker (Peter Facinelli), a young man from the company's research department. Larry and Phil are close friends with a long history together. Larry faces urgent financial difficulties that he alludes to only obliquely; Phil has recently come through a recovery program for alcoholism. Bob, an earnest young Baptist, has few if any regrets. Larry explains that their single goal is to arrange a meeting with Dick Fuller, the CEO of a large company ("the Big Kahuna").

While the three wait in their suite for the convention downstairs to finish, Larry and Phil explain to Bob how to develop and discern character. They also make Bob the bartender for the evening even though he drinks infrequently. Larry remarks that as he has quit smoking, Phil has quit drinking and Bob is religious, it makes them "practically Jesus".

Even though he makes a poor bartender, Bob spends the evening talking to people. In doing so, he inadvertently chats with the Big Kahuna, who invites him over to a private party at another hotel. Larry and Phil excitedly coach Bob through their pitch on industrial lubricants down to an amount of information Bob can handle and supply him with their business cards.

As the pair wait for Bob, they reflect on the nature of human life. However, Bob returns to drop a bombshell: he used the time to discuss religion rather than pitch the company's product. Larry, dumbfounded, challenges Bob and leaves the room devastated. Phil explains to Bob that proselytizing is just another kind of sales pitch. He explains that making real human-to-human contact requires honesty and a genuine interest in other people. Phil gives his reason why he and Larry have a friendship: trust. He then tells Bob that until he can recognize what he should regret, he will not grow in character.

The next morning Phil packs his things. As Larry checks out, he sees Bob talking again to the "Big Kahuna" in the lobby. They exchange a knowing smile as Bob appears to continue to push his own agenda of preaching God instead of selling lubricants. The soundtrack during the credits is "Everybody's Free (to Wear Sunscreen)", a setting of an essay by Mary Schmich.

Cast
 Kevin Spacey as Larry Mann
 Danny DeVito as Phil Cooper
 Peter Facinelli as Bob Walker
 Paul Dawson as Bellboy
 Jen Taylor (uncredited) as Mrs. Johnson
 George F. Miller (uncredited) as Hotel patron leaving lobby

Reception
The Big Kahuna garnered a generally positive critical reception while earning modest returns at the box office.

On Rotten Tomatoes the film has a "Certified Fresh" approval rating of 73% based on reviews from 79 critics. The site's consensus is "Wonderful adaptation of the stage play." On Metacritic the film has a score of 56% based on reviews from 27 critics, indicating "mixed or average reviews".

Roger Ebert of the Chicago Sun-Times called it "Sharp-edged, perfectly timed, funny and thoughtful."

References

External links
 
 
 

1999 films
1990s business films
1999 comedy-drama films
American business films
American comedy-drama films
American films based on plays
1990s English-language films
Films about friendship
Films scored by Christopher Young
Films set in hotels
Films shot in Kansas
Films shot in New York City
Franchise Pictures films
Lionsgate films
Midlife crisis films
Films produced by Elie Samaha
1990s American films